Manas Mukul Pal (born 25 August 1987) is an Indian film director, actor, and screenwriter who predominantly works in Bengali cinema. He came to the limelight after directing his first feature film Colours of Innocence (2016) which was a critical and commercial success. He is working on his second feature film which is going to be a biopic of the freedom fighter Dinesh Gupta.

Early life
Manas completed his schooling from Barasat Peary Charan Sarkar Government High School in 2005 and studied BSc from Barasat Government College.

Career
His debut film as director is Sahaj Paather Gappo(Colours of Innocence) which was released in 2017 in India. This film got warm critical reception and fetched his success. This is the only Bengali film in last three decades to win National Award in Best Child Actor Category (2016).
For this film he bagged two Filmfare Awards (east) 2018 in Best Debut Director and Best Screenplay categories. He was given the Best Promising Director and Best Sound Designer honour for 'Sahaj Pather Goapo' , at the second West Bengal Film Journalist Association award function for films released in 2017.He also received the Best Director award(2018) by Bengal State Government for this film.

Filmography

As director

References

1987 births
Living people
Indian male film actors
Indian film directors
Indian writers